Eric Oakton (28 December 1906 – August 1981) was an English footballer who played for Chelsea and Grimsby Town.

References

External links
Eric Oakton at TheChels.info, an external Wiki

1906 births
1981 deaths
English footballers
Kiveton Park F.C. players
Chelsea F.C. players
Grimsby Town F.C. players
English Football League players
Association football midfielders